The Girl Guides of Saudi Arabia is the national Guiding organization of Saudi Arabia, however work towards World Association of Girl Guides and Girl Scouts membership recognition remains unclear.

See also 

Saudi Arabian Boy Scouts Association

References

http://english.alarabiya.net/en/webtv/reports/2014/10/05/Saudi-Girl-Guides-reunites-parents-with-children-lost-at-holy-sites.html

Scouting and Guiding in Saudi Arabia